Bathinda is a city and municipal corporation in Punjab, India. The city is the administrative headquarters of Bathinda District.

Bathinda is home to the Maharaja Ranjit Singh Punjab Technical University, Central University of Punjab and AIIMS Bathinda. The city is also home to two modern thermal power plants, Guru Nanak Dev Thermal Plant and Guru Hargobind Thermal Plant at Lehra Mohabbat. Also located in the city is a fertilizer plant, two cement plants (Ambuja Cements and UltraTech Cement Limited), a large army cantonment, an air force station, a zoo, and a historic Qila Mubarak fort.

History
Bhatinda was changed to Bathinda to conform to the phonetical expression as locally pronounced. According to Henry George Raverty, Bathinda was known as Tabar-i-Hind (Labb-ut-Twarikh) or Tabarhindh, which roughly translates as ‘Gateway to India’. The earliest mention of Tabar-i-Hind occurs in the Jami-Ul-Hakayat written about 607 Hijri or 1211 AD.

In 1004, Mahmud of Ghazni besieged and captured the local fort, which was located on the route from the northwest into the rich Ganges valley.
It was ruled by 
In 1190, Muhammad of Ghor  attacked and occupied the fort of Bathinda. Prithviraj Chauhan, the ruler of this region, managed to recover possession of the fort thirteen months later in 1191 after the First Battle of Tarain. However, Prithviraj Chauhan was killed in the Second Battle of Tarain and the fort of Bathinda once again came under the control of Muhammad Ghori.

In 14th century present region of bathinda was ruled by Bhati and Bhanot rulers of that time.

1488, Bathinda was conquered by Rao Bika, son of Jodha of Mandore (founder of Jodhpur) and became part of Bikaner princely state. 

Bathinda was an important fort in the area from Delhi to Lahore during the time of the Delhi Sultanate.

In 1634, a battle named Battle of Lahira (at Lahira in Bathinda) was fought between Guru Hargobind and Mughals.

The town had become an important trade and commercial centre under Mughal rule and the Mughal Emperors such as Akbar and Aurangzeb undertook many projects to enhance the fort of Bathinda.

In circa 1754, the town was conquered by Maharaja Ala Singh, the Maharaja of Patiala and since then it followed the history of erstwhile princely state of Patiala. With the dawn of independence and merger of Patiala and East Punjab States into a division called Patiala and East Punjab States Union (PEPSU), Bathinda became a full-fledged district with headquarters at Bathinda city.

Demographics

Population
As per provisional reports of Census India, population of Bathinda city in 2011 is 285,813; male and female are 151,782 and 134,031 respectively. The sex ratio of Bathinda city is 868 females per 1000 males. The number of literate people in Bathinda city are 211,318 of which 118,888 are males while 92,430 are females, average literacy rate is 82.84 percent of which male and female literacy is 87.86 and 77.16 percent respectively. Total children (ages 0 to 6) in Bathinda city are 30,713: 16,472 boys and 14,241 girls. Child sex ratio of girls is 865 per 1000 boys.

Religion
Hinduism is the majority religion in Bathinda city with 62.61% people following the faith. Sikhism is the second most popular religion in the city which is followed by 35.04% of the people. Minorities are Muslims, Christians, Buddhists and Jains. Sikhs count for 70.89% of the population in Bathinda District on a whole in spite of not being a majority in the city.

Geography and climate
Bathinda is in the northwestern region of India and is a part of the Indo-Gangetic alluvial plains. It has an average elevation of 201 metres (660 ft).

Bathinda's climate corresponds to semi-arid with high variation between summer and winter temperatures. Average annual rainfall is relatively low, in a range of 20 mm to 40 mm.

In recent times, Summer temperatures of 49 °C (120 °F) and winter temperatures of 1 °C (about 33 °F) were not unknown in Bathinda, lowest being -1.4 °C (29.48 °F) in the winter of 2013

Government and politics 
Bhatinda city is governed by Municipal Corporation Bhatinda. The administrative wing is headed by Municipal Commissioner Bikramjit Singh Shergill, while the elected wing is headed by Mayor.

Transportation
Bhatinda Railway Station has connectivity to most of the major cities in India. Four national highways: NH 7 (Fazilka - Badrinath National Highway), NH 54 (Kenchiyan, Hanumangarh - Pathankot National Highway), NH 148B   (Bathinda to Kotputli) and NH 754 (Bathinda to Jalalabad, Fazilka) pass through/near the city.

Education

College education 
Colleges within Bathinda include:

Central university of Punjab

 Adesh University 
 Adesh Institute of Medical Sciences and Research 
 Akal University, Talwandi Sabo
 DAV College, Bathinda
 Government Rajindra College, Bathinda
 Guru Kashi University
 Bathinda College of Law
Institute of Hotel Management, Catering Technology and Applied Nutrition, Bathinda

DAV College, Bathinda 
Established in 1969, the college is a pioneer of education in the region.

Central University of Punjab 

The Central University of Punjab Bathinda (Punjab) has been established through the Central Universities Act 2009 which received the assent of the President of India on 20 March 2009. Its territorial jurisdiction extends to the whole State of Punjab.

It started its functioning from Camp Office in April 2009, which happens to be the residence of the Vice Chancellor, and from November 2009 it shifted to its City Campus spread over an area of 35 acres. Construction of the main campus has started on 540 acres of land in Ghudda Village (21.5 km from Bathinda ISBT) on Badal Road. Engineers India Limited, a Navratna Public Sector Undertaking, is providing PMC services for the project.

Maharaja Ranjit Singh Punjab Technical University 
Maharaja Ranjit Singh Punjab Technical University (MRSPTU), formerly Maharaja Ranjit Singh State Technical University, is a State technical university of Punjab located in Bathinda, Punjab, India. It was established in 2015 and has jurisdiction over 11 districts namely Bathinda, Ferozepur, Moga, Faridkot, Sri Muktsar Sahib, Barnala, Mansa, Sangrur, Patiala, Fatehgarh Sahib and Fazilka. University will function from upgraded Giani Zail Singh Punjab Technical University Campus.

Adesh Institute of Medical Science and Research 
Adesh Institute of Medical Sciences & Research (AIMSR) is a private not for profit Medical College associated with a 750-bed Tertiary Care Teaching hospital. It has 150 M.B.B.S. annual seat intake. The college is located on the Barnala Bathinda Highway. The college was established in 2006 under Adesh Institutions. AIMSR is approved by Medical Council of India and permitted by Ministry of Health & Family Welfare. It was affiliated to Baba Farid University of Health Sciences, Faridkot from 2006 to 2011 MBBS Admissions Batch and is affiliated to Adesh University, Bathinda starting 2012.

Notable people
Baba Ratan Hindi, who claimed to be the first Indian Muslim
Harbhajan Mann, actor and singer
Rajinder Gupta, businessman, founder of TridentGroup
Mehar Mittal, actor and producer
Mayank Markande, cricketer
Gurpreet Singh, artist
Manny Aulakh, Canadian international cricketer
Avneet Sidhu, Commonwealth games gold-winning shooter
Parduman Singh Brar, Shotputter, Asiad gold medallist
Balkar Sidhu, singer
Amrit Maan, actor, singer and lyricist
Balwant Gargi, writer and dramatist
Riaz ur Rehman Saghar, Pakistani poet and lyricist
Gurdial Singh, novelist
Kuldeep Manak, singer
Janmeja Singh Sekhon, politician
Sunny and Inder Bawra, composer duo
Kul Sidhu, theatre artist and actress
Mehreen Pirzada, actress

Environmental Issues
There has been increasing incidence of various types of cancer in and around Bathinda. It is attributed to the presence of polluting industries and the indiscriminate use of modern pesticides and other toxic materials in farming. A 2007 epidemiological study found that the surface waters of Bathinda are contaminated with arsenic, cadmium, chromium, selenium and mercury primarily due to the discharge of untreated waste water from surrounding industries. Unscientific farming practices, that emerged after the introduction of Green Revolution, are also alleged to be a reason for growing incidence of not just cancer but also, high rates of spontaneous abortions, reproductive ailments, genetic deformities, anaemia, diarrhoea, vomiting, fluorosis and a host of skin ailments including rashes and boils. Many young couples are also reported to be migrating out to save their children from adverse effects. Hence the government has completely banned the use of ground water in the city for drinking purposes.

In the cleanliness survey, conducted by the Union Ministry of Urban Development, Bathinda scored an all-India rank of 79 and number 1 rank in Punjab.

Suburbs of Bathinda
 Bhucho Mandi 15 km
 Goniana 14 km
 Maur Mandi  37 km
 Rampura Phul  30 km
 Talwandi Sabo 29 km
 Raman 42 km
 Sangat, India 21 km
 Bhagta Bhai, Kotha Guru ka 35 km

See also
 Bathinda district

References

External links

 Official website of Bathinda district

 
Articles containing potentially dated statements from 2001
All articles containing potentially dated statements